Matthias Martin Tischler (born March 18, 1968 in Münchberg, Bavaria) is a German palaeographer, philologist and historian, stemming from a multinational and -confessional family with Austrian, Bohemian, French and Hungarian origins. He is married to the Catalan philologist and linguist Eulàlia Vernet i Pons and lives with his family in L'Ametlla del Vallès, Barcelona and Münchberg.

Academic studies and professional career 
Tischler studied Classical Philology and Medieval Latin, Medieval and Modern History, Applied Historical Sciences and Romance Philology 
at the Universities of Heidelberg and Munich (1989–1995). After his Heidelberg PhD in 1998 he was a Post-graduate Fellow at the German Historical Institute Paris (1998–1999) and at the University of Bamberg (1999–2001), and a Scientific Assistant, Collaborator and Lecturer at the Hugo von Sankt Viktor-Institut in Frankfurt and the Goethe University Frankfurt (2001–2009). After his Dresden habilitation in 2009 he was an Associate Professor of Medieval and Transcultural History at the University of Dresden up to 2012. Since 2013 he has been a Research Professor of Transcultural Medieval History at the Institut d’Estudis Medievals (IEM) of the Autonomous University of Barcelona (UAB). In the academic year 2014/2015 he was visiting professor at the École Pratique des Hautes Études, Paris. In the academic year 2015/2016 he was visiting fellow at the Medieval Institute of the University of Notre Dame, Indiana. In 2016, he accepted the prestigious position of a Senior Research Professor of ICREA (Institució Catalana de Recerca i Estudis Avançats, English: Catalan Institution for Research and Advanced Studies), Barcelona. In spring term 2019 he was a short-term visiting fellow of the Institute for Advanced Study, Princeton. In January 2020 he was a visiting fellow at the Herzog August Bibliothek in Wolfenbüttel. Since summer 2020 he has been an elected member of the Academia Europaea.

PhD and thesis of habilitation 
Tischler wrote his PhD on the production, transmission, reception and edition of Einhart's Vita Karoli in the Middle Ages and Modern Times. His habilitation thesis deals with the biblical legacy of the Augustinian abbey of St. Victor in Paris, a centre of scholastic learning with Europe-wide influence from the 12th to the 15th centuries.

Research fields and publications 
Tischler has published in various languages (Catalan, English, French, German, Italian and Spanish) on the dissemination and use of Ostrogothic, Visigothic and Carolingian biographical, historiographical, juridical and philosophical texts and their effects on religious, social and political identity building, on the role of the Jews’, Christians’ and Muslims’ sacred and polemical texts from comparative intra- and transcultural standpoints and on central aspects of the intellectual history of individual scholars and religious orders in the Early, High and Late Middle Ages. He is a specialist of worldwide renown on the tradition of Carolingian culture in the Middle Ages. His more recent research interests are focused on the role of Carolingian culture in processes of identity building in the peripheries of post-Carolingian Europe (e.g. in Septimania and Catalonia), on the interrelationship between the medieval edition of biblical manuscripts and historiographical writing in transcultural societies, and on the transfer and transformation of scholasticism in European centres and peripheries of learning (e.g. in Franconia, Saxonia, Catalonia and Aragón). Tischler's scholarly agenda revolves around developing codicological, palaeographical and philological studies within transcultural history, following methodologically his academic grandfather Bernhard Bischoff and his academic father , the establishment of codicologically and philologically grounded Transcultural Medieval Studies on the Iberian Peninsula, the Mediterranean World and beyond, and the development of a new master narrative that accommodates medieval collective religious and ethnic memories conflicting with each other, in order to historically anchoring Europe's religious, cultural, and political plurality in a global world order.

Projects 
Tischler is just finishing a comprehensive monograph on the more or less unknown transfer of early scholastic learning from Northern France to the North-Eastern peripheries of the Holy Roman Empire in the 12th and 13th centuries. In addition, he is writing the first part of a trilogy of the history of Christian-Muslim encounters and entanglements in the medieval Iberian Peninsula between the 8th and 15th centuries. In March 2014, he has been installed as the official editor of the new critical edition of Einhart's Vita Karoli, which will be published by the Monumenta Germaniae Historica in Munich. From May 2015 to April 2019, he co-directed (together with Walter Pohl) the FWF-project "Bible and Historiography in Transcultural Iberian Societies, 8th to 12th Centuries" at the Austrian Academy of Sciences, Vienna. Since 2015, he is responsible for the Latin section of the Corpus Biblicum Catalanicum, Barcelona. Since December 2019, he is director of the four-years project "Preaching Christ from a Transcultural Standpoint" which is preparing the critical edition of the Homiliary of Luculentius, the oldest indigenous work of Carolingian text culture in early medieval Catalonia (ca. 900). Since September 2020, he is (together with Walter Pohl) director of the four-years FWF-Project "Carolingian Culture in Septimania and Catalonia: The Transformation of a Multi-Ethnic Middle Ground of the Euro-Mediterranean World". Tischler is also member of the international network "The Transformation of the Carolingian World" (TCW).

Scientific activities 
Tischler is the founder and editor-in-chief of the Journal of Transcultural Medieval Studies (JTMS), published by de Gruyter (Berlin - Munich - Boston) since 2014, which has been transformed into the Series Transcultural Medieval Studies, published by Brepols (Turnhout) from 2019 onwards. He is furthermore co-editor of Medievalia. Revista d’Estudis Medievals, UAB, of Arxiu de textos catalans antics of the Institut d'Estudis Catalans, of Bibliotheca Philosophorum Medii Aevi Cataloniae, published by Obrador edèndum (Santa Coloma de Queralt), and of Rarissima Mediaevalia.

Since 1992, Tischler has been invited for giving talks throughout Europe and North America, especially Austria (Vienna, Zwettl), Denmark (Odense), England (Leeds), France (Auxerre, Bordeaux, Nice, Paris and Tours), Germany (Berlin, Cologne, Dresden, Frankfurt/M., Hamburg, Heidelberg, Ingelheim, Leipzig, Mainz, Reichenau, Rostock, Seligenstadt, Tübingen, Weingarten and Wolfenbüttel), Greece (Rethymno), Italy (Rome, Spoleto and Vatican City), Portugal (Lisbon), Spain (Barcelona, Bellaterra, Córdoba, Girona, Lleida, Madrid, Murcia and Santiago de Compostela), Switzerland (Berne, Einsiedeln and Fribourg), Canada (Montréal) and USA (Ann Arbor, Kalamazoo and Princeton).

Tischler has been a scientific consultant in the preparation of several historical exhibitions ("Kaiser Heinrich II.", Bamberg, July 9 – Oktober 20, 2002; "Canossa 1077. Erschütterung der Welt. Geschichte, Kunst und Kultur am Aufgang der Romanik", Paderborn, July 21 – November 5, 2006).

In September 2013, Tischler initiated the donation of the private library of the German philosopher  (1921–2013) to the Autonomous University of Barcelona (UAB). In November 2019, he has initiated an official exchange of publications (journals, book series) between the Institut d’Estudis Medievals (IEM) of the Autonomous University of Barcelona (UAB) and the Forschungsstelle für vergleichende Ordensgeschichte (FOVOG) of the University of Dresden.

Media activities 
Tischler has been the scientific expert of the radio report "Einhart in Hessen", Hessischer Rundfunk, HR 2 Kulturradio (2002; script and moderation: Andreas Horchler, Frankfurt/M.) and of the successful European documentary-drama "Karl der Große" (2010–2012; script: Christian Weber, Taglichtmedia, Cologne; director: Gabriele Wengler, Munich).

PhD students and habilitated scholar 
PhD Students of Tischler are Patrick S. Marschner (Vienna), Ekaterina Novokhatko (Bellaterra), Óscar Armando Perdomo Ceballos (Berlin/Bellaterra) and Silke Engelhardt (Heidelberg/Bellaterra). Tischler is one of the directors of the thesis of habilitation defended by Britta Müller-Schauenburg (Munich).

Main publications 
Einharts Vita Karoli. Studien zur Entstehung, Überlieferung und Rezeption (MGH. Schriften 48, I–II), Hanover 2001 .
Die Christus- und Engelweihe im Mittelalter. Texte, Bilder und Studien zu einem ekklesiologischen Erzählmotiv (Erudiri Sapientia. Studien zum Mittelalter und zu seiner Rezeptionsgeschichte 5), Berlin 2005 .
(together with Alexander Fidora), Christlicher Norden – Muslimischer Süden. Ansprüche und Wirklichkeiten von Christen, Juden und Muslimen auf der Iberischen Halbinsel im Hoch- und Spätmittelalter (Erudiri Sapientia. Studien zum Mittelalter und zu seiner Rezeptionsgeschichte 7), Munster/W. 2011 .
(together with Michael Borgolte), Transkulturelle Verflechtungen im mittelalterlichen Jahrtausend. Europa, Ostasien, Afrika, Darmstadt 2012 .
Die Bibel in Saint-Victor zu Paris. Das Buch der Bücher als Gradmesser für wissenschaftliche, soziale und ordensgeschichtliche Umbrüche im europäischen Hoch- und Spätmittelalter (Corpus Victorinum. Instrumenta 6), Munster/W. 2014 .
(together with Hanns Peter Neuheuser and Ralf M. W. Stammberger), Diligens scrutator sacri eloquii. Beiträge zur Exegese- und Theologiegeschichte des Mittelalters. Festgabe für Rainer Berndt SJ zum 65. Geburtstag (Archa Verbi. Subsidia 14), Munster/W. 2016 .
(together with Patrick S. Marschner), Transcultural Approaches to the Bible: Exegesis and Historical Writing across Medieval Worlds (Transcultural Medieval Studies 1), Turnhout 2021 .
 After the Carolingians: Catalonia and Europe in Transformation [= Early Medieval Europe 30, 4 (2022)], London et al. 2022 .
 Carlemany a Europa: història i memòria (Filologia UB), Barcelona 2022 .

External links 
 Personal Homepage ICREA
 Personal Homepage IEM (UAB) 
 Personal Homepage academia.edu
 Personal Homepage Academia Europaea

1968 births
Living people
German philologists
Academic staff of the Autonomous University of Barcelona
Heidelberg University alumni